Al-Tash was a UNHCR-administered refugee camp in Iraq, described as being outside the city of Ramadi in western Iraq. In 2003, it was described as having 13,000 men, women, and children. In 2003, Human Rights Watch visited the camp, finding that some residents had lived there since as early as 1982, when they had been removed from border areas of Iran occupied by Iraq during the Iran–Iraq War.

References

Refugee camps in Iraq
Al Anbar Governorate